Berezovka is a rural locality (a settlement) in Martovsky Selsoviet, Khabarsky District, Altai Krai, Russia. The population was 42 as of 2013. It was founded in 1970. There are 2 streets.

Geography 
Berezovka is located 19 km south of Khabary (the district's administrative centre) by road. Martovka is the nearest rural locality.

References 

Rural localities in Khabarsky District